Jeanbaptiste Albert Joseph Cau (27 March 1875 in Tourcoing – 1921) was a French rower who competed in the 1900 Summer Olympics. He was part of the French boat Cercle de l'Aviron Roubaix, which won the gold medal in the coxed four.

References

External links

Jean Cau's profile at Geneanet 

1875 births
1921 deaths
Sportspeople from Tourcoing
French male rowers
Olympic rowers of France
Rowers at the 1900 Summer Olympics
Olympic gold medalists for France
Olympic medalists in rowing
Medalists at the 1900 Summer Olympics
19th-century French people
20th-century French people
Date of death missing
Place of death missing